K-324 was a Soviet Navy Victor III-class submarine in reserve since 1997. It was assigned to the Northern Fleet.

Service history
K-324s keel was laid down on 29 February 1980 at Komsomolsk Shipyard in Komsomolsk-on-Amur in the Russian Far East. It was launched on 7 October 1980 and commissioned on 30 December 1980.  It was the seventh submarine of the class built at Komsomolsk.

Collision

The submarine was heavily damaged, to all reports. The United States government denied any of their submarines were in the area, and no US submarine reported any damage during that time period, but the Soviets reported none of their submarines were in the Bay aside from K-324.

Fleet transfer and operations
K-324 transited across the Arctic in November and was officially transferred to the Northern Fleet on 3 December 1982.

Disabled

The submarine was towed to Cienfuegos, Cuba for repairs by a Soviet salvage ship beginning on 5 November. Soviet technicians recovered some parts of McCloys array.

Later activities and decommissioning

K-324 was again involved in operations around US waters in 1985. She was reported to have detected American SSBNs on three occasions, tailing them for 28 hours. K-324 took advantage of temperature variations in the Gulf Stream. K-324 was in reserve by 1997. K-324 was written off in 2000 for scrapping.

References

External links
Mystery of the Black Prince (in Russian)

Victor-class submarines
Ships built in the Soviet Union
1980 ships
Cold War submarines of the Soviet Union
Soviet submarine accidents
Maritime incidents in 1981
Maritime incidents in 1983
1983 in military history